Çanakçı is a town and a district of Giresun Province in the Black Sea region of Turkey.

Çanakçı is a small town of 1,848 people in a district of forest and scattered villages inland from the Black Sea coastal town of Görele.

It was founded as a village of Görele. Çanakçı became a town in 1991.

Famous "Kuşdili" festival is held in Çanakçı every July. Hundreds of people from nearby places attend this festival.

The Kemenche, which is one of the traditional Eastern Black Sea instruments, is played in Çanakçı. One of the most important folk songs is "Çanakçı'dan aşağı".

References

External links
  
  

Populated places in Giresun Province
Districts of Giresun Province
Towns in Turkey